The 1976 Federation Cup was the 14th edition of the most important competition between national teams in women's tennis.  For the first time, enough teams entered to necessitate pre-qualifying rounds.  The tiebreaker also was used for the first time. The tournament was held at The Spectrum in Philadelphia, Pennsylvania, United States, from 22 to 29 August. The United States defeated Australia in the final, in what was the sixth final between United States and Australia.

Qualifying round
Eight nations played off in July for a place in the main draw.

Luxembourg, Mexico, Philippines, and Switzerland advanced to Main Draw.

Main draw

All ties were played at The Spectrum in Philadelphia, United States, on indoor carpet courts.

1st Round losing teams play in Consolation Rounds

First round

Indonesia vs. Switzerland

Norway vs. Yugoslavia

Israel vs. United States

New Zealand vs. Argentina

Brazil vs. Netherlands

Denmark vs. Spain

France vs. Great Britain

Hungary vs. Philippines

Sweden vs. Japan

South Korea vs. South Africa

Italy vs. Luxembourg

Mexico vs. West Germany

Belgium vs. Rhodesia

Romania vs. Australia

Second round

Canada vs. Switzerland

Yugoslavia vs. United States

Argentina vs. Netherlands

Denmark vs. Uruguay

Sweden vs. South Africa

Italy vs. West Germany

Belgium vs. Australia

Quarterfinals

Switzerland vs. United States

Netherlands vs. Denmark

Great Britain vs. South Africa

West Germany vs. Australia

Semifinals

United States vs. Netherlands

Great Britain vs. Australia

Final

United States vs. Australia

Consolation Rounds

Draw

First round

Brazil vs. Luxembourg

Japan vs. Israel

South Korea vs. Mexico

Indonesia vs. New Zealand

Norway vs. Spain

Quarterfinals

France vs. Rhodesia

Brazil vs. Japan

South Korea vs. New Zealand

Spain vs. Romania

Semifinals

France vs. Brazil

South Korea vs. Romania

Final

France vs. Romania

References

Billie Jean King Cups by year
Federation
Tennis tournaments in the United States
Sports in Philadelphia
Federation Cup
Federation Cup
Federation Cup
Federation Cup